Lea Rowing Club is a rowing club based in Hackney, London, U.K. on the River Lea.

Founded in 1980 by the merger of several clubs, it is now the largest club in East London, catering for adults and children who want to compete at the highest level nationally and internationally, as well as those who want to enjoy rowing socially.

History

Lea Rowing Club was founded in 1980 by the members of all of the five rowing clubs then active on the Springhill, Hackney site. The clubs that merged were Crowland, Gladstone Warwick, City Orient, and Britannia rowing clubs, joined by the women's club, Stuart Ladies.

The club has produced multiple British champions.

Honours

British champions

Henley Royal Regatta

References

External links
 https://www.learc.org.uk/

Sports clubs established in 1980
Rowing clubs in England
Sport in London
Boathouses in the United Kingdom
History of rowing